Big Božna Creek or simply the Božna, also known as Božja Creek, or Big Creek is a stream in northwestern Slovenia. It is the left source tributary of the Gradaščica, the right one being Little Creek. It was recorded under the German names Salog bach or Sallog Bach (i.e., Zalog Creek) in the 18th century.

Course
The source of Big Božna Creek is in the Polhov Gradec Hills west of Ljubljana, not far from Kremenik. It forms part of the watershed of the Ljubljanica River. The road from Polhov Gradec to Črni Vrh runs through the Big Božna Valley. The Big Božna is joined by Little Božna Creek (recorded in German as the Botschnia or Botschnia bach in the 18th century) about 2 km north-northwest of Polhov Gradec, and then by Little Creek south of Polhov Gradec to form the Gradaščica River.

References

External links
Big Božna Creek on Geopedia 

Rivers of Upper Carniola